Löwenströmska lasarettet is a locality situated in Upplands Väsby Municipality, Stockholm County, Sweden, with a population of 518 in 2010.

It takes its name from a hospital that was founded by the brother of Jacob Johan Anckarström, the murderer of king Gustav III of Sweden. His brother, Gustaf Adolf Anckarström, changed his surname to Löwenström and founded the hospital as an act of penance.

The original hospital was built in 1809–1811 and was in use until 1993. A number of other buildings were added over the years, including a sanatorium and a psychiatric hospital. A new building from the 1960s took over most of the functions of the hospital once it opened. The old buildings are now disused.

Gallery

References 

Populated places in Upplands Väsby Municipality